Afrocarpus is a genus of conifers of the family Podocarpaceae. Two to six species are recognized. They are evergreen trees native to Africa. Afrocarpus was designated a genus in 1989, when several species formerly classified in Podocarpus and Nageia were reclassified.

Taxonomy
Afrocarpus gaussenii was based on a single specimen of a cultivated individual of Afrocarpus falcatus in Madagascar. Its distinctive features might have resulted from the conditions of its cultivation. No species of Afrocarpus is known to be native to Madagascar.

In a recent treatment of Afrocarpus, only two species were recognized; A. dawei, A. gracilior, and A. usambarensis were sunk into A. falcatus. The reason for this merger was that "variation across the group appears to be essentially continuous".

Studies based on anatomical, biogeographical, morphological, and DNA evidence suggest the following relationships:

Species

Description 
Afrocarpus are evergreen trees. The individuals of the largest species, Afrocarpus falcatus, may reach a height of 60 meters. The thin bark often peels with scale-like plates.

The leaves are simple and flat. The phyllotaxis or leaf arrangement is usually spiral but may be opposite on young plants. The leaves are generally lanceolate in shape and coriaceous in texture. They have a single visible midrib. Stomata are found on both surfaces of the leaf.

Afrocarpus are dioecious, with male pollen cones and female seed cones borne on separate individual plants. The cones are short pedunculate and usually develop from axillary buds.

The male pollen cones are narrowly cylindrical and resemble catkins. They grow in small groups of two or three cones. The peduncles are glabrous. Each pollen cone has numerous spirally inserted microsporophylls each with two basal pollen sacs producing bisaccate pollen.

The female seed cones are solitary. Their peduncles may have small scale leaves. The cones consist of several sterile cone scales and one fertile cone scale with just one seed producing ovule. The sterile scales wither as the cone matures, unlike in the closely related genus Podocarpus where the scales fuse to form a fleshy receptacle. A part of the scale supporting the ovule develops into a rounded fleshy covering enclosing the seed entirely known as the epimatium. At maturity the epimatium varies in shape from subglobose to elliptic or obovoid and in color from greenish to yellow or brown.

Distribution 
As the name intimates, Afrocarpus is native to Africa. The species are distributed through the Afromontane forests of eastern and southern Africa, descending to the Indian Ocean coast in South Africa. The genus is native to Burundi, Democratic Republic of the Congo, Eswatini, Ethiopia, Kenya, Malawi, Mozambique, Rwanda, São Tomé and Príncipe, South Africa, Tanzania and Uganda.

The podocarps are associated with the ancient supercontinent of Gondwana, where they were characteristic of the cool, moist southern Gondwana flora. Gondwana broke up into the continents of South America, Africa, India, Australia, and Antarctica between 160 and 30 million years ago. As Africa drifted north, it became hotter and drier, and the podocarps generally retreated to the cool, moist highlands of eastern and southern Africa.

Uses 
In South Africa, this wood is mostly used to make exclusive furniture.

References

External links
 Afrocarpus At: Podocarpaceae At: The Gymnosperm Database
PROTA4U, a new interactive webdatabase on plants used by people in tropical Africa.

Podocarpaceae
Podocarpaceae genera
Dioecious plants
Afrotropical realm flora